is a former tennis player from Japan.

Born in Tokyo, Tezuka spent most of her career competing on the ITF Women's Circuit, where she was successful in doubles, with a total of 15 titles. 

Tezuka, a right-handed player, made the occasional main draw appearance in doubles on the WTA Tour, including a quarterfinal appearance at the Japan Open in 2004.

She retired from professional tennis after the 2012 season.

ITF Circuit finals

Singles (0–3)

Doubles (15–19)

References

External links
 
 

1980 births
Living people
Japanese female tennis players
Sportspeople from Tokyo
20th-century Japanese women
21st-century Japanese women